Alexander Gottlieb Baumgarten (17 July 1714 – 27 May 1762) was a German philosopher. He was a brother to theologian Siegmund Jakob Baumgarten (1706–1757).

Biography
Baumgarten was born in Berlin as the fifth of seven sons of the pietist pastor of the garrison, Jacob Baumgarten, and of his wife Rosina Elisabeth. Both his parents died early, and he was taught by Martin Georg Christgau where he learned Hebrew and became interested in Latin poetry.

Philosophical work
While the meanings of words often change as a result of cultural developments, Baumgarten's reappraisal of aesthetics is often seen as a key moment in the development of aesthetic philosophy. Previously the word aesthetics had merely meant "sensibility" or "responsiveness to stimulation of the senses" in its use by ancient writers. With the development of art as a commercial enterprise linked to the rise of a nouveau riche class across Europe, the purchasing of art inevitably led to the question, "what is good art?". Baumgarten developed aesthetics to mean the study of good and bad "taste",  thus good and bad art, linking good taste with beauty.

By trying to develop an idea of good and bad taste, he also in turn generated philosophical debate around this new meaning of aesthetics. Without it, there would be no basis for aesthetic debate as there would be no objective criterion, basis for comparison, or reason from which one could develop an objective argument.

Views on aesthetics

Baumgarten appropriated the word aesthetics, which had always meant "sensation", to mean taste or "sense" of beauty. In so doing, he gave the word a different significance, thereby inventing its modern usage. The word had been used differently since the time of the ancient Greeks to mean the ability to receive stimulation from one or more of the five bodily senses. In his Metaphysic, § 607, Baumgarten defined taste, in its wider meaning, as the ability to judge according to the senses, instead of according to the intellect. Such a judgment of taste he saw as based on feelings of pleasure or displeasure. A science of aesthetics would be, for Baumgarten, a deduction of the rules or principles of artistic or natural beauty from individual "taste". Baumgarten may have been motivated to respond to Pierre Bonhours' (b.1666) opinion, published in a pamphlet in the late 17th century, that Germans were incapable of appreciating art and beauty.

Reception
In 1781, Immanuel Kant declared that Baumgarten's aesthetics could never contain objective rules, laws, or principles of natural or artistic beauty.

Nine years later, in his Critique of Judgment, Kant conformed to Baumgarten's new usage and employed the word aesthetic to mean the judgment of taste or the estimation of the beautiful. For Kant, an aesthetic judgment is subjective in that it relates to the internal feeling of pleasure or displeasure and not to any qualities in an external object.

In 1897, Leo Tolstoy, in his What is Art?, criticized Baumgarten's book on aesthetics. Tolstoy opposed "Baumgarten's trinity – Good, Truth and Beauty…." Tolstoy asserted that "these words not only have no definite meaning, but they hinder us from giving any definite meaning to existing art…." Baumgarten, he said, claimed that there are three ways to know perfection: "Beauty is the perfect (the absolute) perceived by the senses. Truth is the perfect perceived by reason. The good is the perfect attained by the moral will." Tolstoy, however, contradicted Baumgarten's theory and claimed that good, truth, and beauty have nothing in common and may even oppose each other. 
 

Whatever the limitations of Baumgarten's theory of aesthetics, Frederick Copleston credits him with playing a formative role in German aesthetics, extending Christian Wolff's philosophy to topics that Wolff did not consider, and demonstrating the existence of a legitimate topic for philosophical analysis that could not be reduced to abstract logical analysis.

Metaphysics
For many years, Kant used Baumgarten's Metaphysica as a handbook or manual for his lectures on that topic. Georg Friedrich Meier translated the Metaphysics from Latin to German, an endeavour which – according to Meier – Baumgarten himself had planned, but could not find the time to execute.

Works 
 Dissertatio chorographica, Notiones superi et inferi, indeque adscensus et descensus, in chorographiis sacris occurentes, evolvens (1735)
 Meditationes philosophicae de nonnullis ad poema pertinentibus (doctoral thesis, 1735)
 De ordine in audiendis philosophicis per triennium academicum quaedam praefatus acroases proximae aestati destinatas indicit Alexander Gottlieb Baumgarten (1738)
 Metaphysica (1739)
 Ethica philosophica (1740)
 Alexander Gottlieb Baumgarten eröffnet Einige Gedancken vom vernünfftigen Beyfall auf Academien, und ladet zu seiner Antritts-Rede [...] ein (1740)
 Serenissimo potentissimo principi Friderico, Regi Borussorum marchioni brandenburgico S. R. J. archicamerario et electori, caetera, clementissimo dominio felicia regni felicis auspicia, a d. III. Non. Quinct. 1740 (1740)
 Philosophische Briefe von Aletheophilus (1741)
 Scriptis, quae moderator conflictus academici disputavit, praefatus rationes acroasium suarum Viadrinarum reddit Alexander Gottlieb Baumgarten (1743)
 Aesthetica (1750)
 Initia Philosophiae Practicae. Primae Acroamatice (1760)
 Acroasis logica in Christianum L.B. de Wolff (1761, 2nd ed. 1773)
 Ius naturae (posthum 1763)
 Sciagraphia encyclopaedia philosophicae (ed. Johs. Christian Foerster 1769)
 Philosophia generalis (ed. Johs. Christian Foerster 1770)
 Alex. Gottl. Baumgartenii Praelectiones theologiae dogmaticae (ed. Salomon Semmler; 1773)
 Alexander Gottlieb Baumgartens Metaphysik (translated by Georg Friedrich Meier 1766)
 Gedanken über die Reden Jesu nach dem Inhalt der evangelischen Geschichten (ed. F.G. Scheltz & A.B. Thiele; 1796–1797)

English translations
 Alexander Baumgarten, Metaphysics. A Critical Translation with Kant's Elucidations, Selected Notes, and Related Materials translated and edited by Courtney D. Fugate and John Hymers, London, New York: Bloomsbury Publishing, 2013.

Notes

References

Further reading
 Eric Watkins (ed.), Kant's Critique of Pure Reason: Background Source Materials, Cambridge University Press, 2009 (Chapter 3 contains a partial translation of the 'Metaphysics').

External links

 Baumgarten and Kant on Metaphysics 2018  Courtney D. Fugate (Editor), John Hymers (Editor) 
 Jan Lekschas, The Baumgarten Family (in German)
 Alexander Gottlieb Baumgarten (1714-1762) (in German)

1714 births
1762 deaths
Writers from Berlin
People from the Margraviate of Brandenburg
18th-century philosophers
18th-century Protestants
18th-century German philosophers
Philosophers of art
University of Halle alumni
University of Jena alumni
Academic staff of the University of Halle
Academic staff of European University Viadrina
18th-century German male writers